The men's 10,000 metres at the 2019 World Athletics Championships was held at the Khalifa International Stadium in Doha on 6 October 2019.

Summary
Seventeen of the twenty-one starters were born in Eastern Africa, a familiar situation for long distance events.  Here the Kenyan team of Rhonex Kipruto and Rodgers Kwemoi took to the front to keep the pace fast and returning silver medalist Joshua Cheptegei, who was a favorite after the track retirement of Mo Farah, was also near the front.  By the 5,000 metre mark at 13:33.20 (27:07 pace), only 10 had fallen off the back.  Nine laps later, Cheptegei took over the front and two more fell off the back, though Hagos Gebrhiwet, Yemaneberhan Crippa and Lopez Lomong were barely hanging on to the fast-pace.  Behind Cheptegei, the 19 year old Kipruto and the tall figure of the new indoor mile record holder Yomif Kejelcha looking like he was waiting to unleash that shorter distance speed.  After Mohammed Ahmed fell off the back with 500 meters to go, the group was still five, single file, with Cheptegei still leading the race.  Running through traffic at the bell, Kwemoi and Andamlak Belihu couldn't keep up and it looked like the medalsts were decided.  Down the final backstretch, Kejelcha moved right onto Cheptegei's shoulder then into a slight lead.  The gap left Kipruto running for bronze.  As they entered the final turn Cheptegei kept Kejelcha on his outside, while he ran the shorter distance along the inside.  Coming off the turn, Cheptegei had the speed, separating slightly from Kejelcha, growing to a 5 metre lead by the finish and claiming gold.

Records
Before the competition records were as follows:

The following records were set at the competition:

Qualification standard
The standard to qualify automatically for entry was 27:40.00.

Only 18 qualifiers did it in the period: Onesphore Nzikwinkunda (BDI) 28:11.90, Rodrigue Kwizéra (BDI), and Thierry Ndikumwenayo (BDI), were qualified during Cross Country Championships (top finishing position at designated competitions – automatically qualifies, irrespective of whether his performance has reached the Entry Standard).
Soufiane Bouchikhi and Yeman Crippa were invited to complete the event for Ranking.

Schedule
The event schedule, in local time (UTC+3), was as follows:

Results
The race started on 6 October at 20:04.

References

10,000
10,000 metres at the World Athletics Championships